The following is a list of the residence halls within the Pennsylvania State University system.

University Park

In addition to the following residence halls, the University Park campus provides housing in Eastview Terrace, White Course Apartments, and Nittany Apartments.

Residence Commons
The residence commons are common areas for each of the residence hall areas.  Each one has a dining hall and a computer lab.  At one point in time, each had a radio station.  WEHR (East Halls Radio), which operated in Johnston Commons until 2005, was the last to survive.

 Waring Commons (West Halls)
 Warnock Commons (North Halls)
 Redifer Commons (South Halls)
 Findlay/Johnston Commons (East Halls)
 Pollock Commons (Pollock Halls)

Other resource areas
 Nittany Community Center (Nittany)

Houses a TV lounge, laundry facilities, Commons Desk, Residence Life/Housing Office for residents of Nittany Apartments and Suites.
 Weston Community Center (White Course)

Houses a TV lounge, Commons Desk, Residence Life/Housing Office for residents of White Course Apartments.
 Brill Hall (Eastview Terrace)

Houses a TV lounge, Front Desk, Residence Life/Housing Office for residents of Eastview Terrace.

East Halls
East Halls is the largest group of residence halls on campus, and is served by Findlay/Johnston Commons.  It is reserved primarily for first-year student housing, and most residents share a double room with a roommate. The area's special living options are First-Year Interest in Liberal Arts and Education and Tri-Service ROTC. All of the buildings in the East Halls residence area are named after former governors of Pennsylvania. All of the halls and commons within East Halls are connected via an underground maintenance tunnel system (entrance doors locked). The residence halls are:

Bigler
Brumbaugh
Curtin
Earle
Fisher
Geary
Hastings
Martin
McKean
Packer
Pennypacker
Pinchot
Snyder
Sproul
Stone
Stuart
Tener

North Halls
North Halls is the smallest residence hall complex at the University Park campus, consisting of five residence halls. They are known as the most comfortable on campus, with all rooms being carpeted and having their own bathroom. Nearly all rooms in North residence halls are suites for two or four students, however there are a few rooms for only a single resident.  The two- and four-person suites are made up of four rooms with two bedrooms with a shared living room separating them, and the bathroom connected to the shared living room.

Leete was the first hall converted to this format.  North Halls special living options are Arts and Architecture (A&A), Business and Society House (BASH), and EARTH House.

Beam
Holmes
Leete
Runkle
Robinson
This building was once converted to offices for the Business Administration department, and more recently the Dickinson School of Law. The structure of Beam is identical to the other North Halls residence halls. It was reopened as of the Fall 2009 semester.

Pollock Halls
Pollock Halls is the third-largest residence hall complex on campus, consisting of co-ed and female only residence halls.  Most rooms are shared by two students.  Pollock Halls houses nine special livings options: Be House (Be-Engaged as of August 2013), Discover House, EASI (Engineering and Applied Sciences), Forensic Science Interest House, HEAL (Health Education and Awareness in Living), HAC (Helping Across the Community), ILH (International Languages), LIFE (Living in a Free Environment as of August 2013), and WISE (Women in Science and Engineering).

Beaver - Co-ed Hall with several Special Living Options
Hartranft - Co-ed First Year Hall
Hiester - Co-ed Upperclassman Hall
Mifflin - Co-ed First Year Hall
Porter - Co-ed First Year Hall
Ritner - Co-ed First Year Hall
Shulze - Co-Ed Upperclassman Hall
Shunk - Co-ed First Year Hall
Wolf - Co-ed First Year Hall

South Halls and South Proper

South Halls offers housing for Schreyer Honors College students in Atherton and Simmons, and in addition offers male, female and co-ed residence halls. At one point both McElwain Hall and Simmons Hall both contained a dining complex, but as of May 2011 their dining areas were eliminated to increase residential room space. South Halls also contains housing for sororities. 

Atherton (newly remodeled restrooms as of August 2013, adopting a "wet core" restroom concept).
Simmons
McElwain
Eastview Terrace (for more information on Eastview Terrace, scroll down)
Nittany Apartments (for more information on Nittany Apartments, scroll down)

South Proper
Chace (is a brand new residence hall facility with A/C and kitchenette and opened its doors in August 2013.  Also includes a "wet core" restroom concept)
These two buildings are connected to each other:
Haller (newly remodeled with A/C and kitchenettes as of August 2013.  Also includes a "wet core" restroom concept)
Lyons (newly remodeled with A/C and kitchenettes as of August 2013.  Also includes a "wet core" restroom concept)

These two buildings are connected to each other:
Cross (newly remodeled with A/C and kitchenettes as of January 2014. Also includes a "wet core" restroom concept)
Ewing (newly remodeled with A/C and kitchenettes as of January 2014. Also includes a "wet core" restroom concept)

These two buildings are connected to each other:
Cooper (will be newly remodeled with A/C and kitchenettes as of August 2014. Will include a "wet core" restroom concept)
Hoyt (will be newly remodeled with A/C and kitchenettes as of August 2014.  Will include a "wet core" restroom concept)

These two buildings are connected to each other:
Stephens (will be newly remodeled with A/C and kitchenettes as of January 2015. Will include a "wet core" restroom concept)
Hibbs with Alpha Delta Pi and Alpha Chi Omega Sororities (will be newly remodeled with A/C and kitchenettes as of January 2015. Will include a "wet core" restroom concept)

*A Wet Core restroom concept eliminates the need to have "gender specific" restrooms in that there is a common sink space that everyone shares with every toilet/shower in a separate room behind a locked door.  The wet core concept eliminates the traditional restroom design and allows for more privacy for any student without having to worry about gender obstacles.

Nittany Apartments and Suites
Nittany Apartments and Suites provide the luxury of apartment and suite living while allowing students to still live on campus. Nittany Apartments houses same-sex students in either two-bedroom or four-bedroom apartments, complete with bathroom, living room, and kitchen. Nittany Suites—made up exclusively of Nittany Hall—houses single upperclass students in two-bedroom suites. Four people live in each suite. These living areas are available to upperclass students.

Eastview Terrace
Eastview Terrace is a residence location specifically for sophomores, juniors, and seniors. It houses 806 undergraduates, providing a private bedroom and bath for each student. Its location, east of South Halls, is perfect for an atmosphere that feels as though it off campus while remaining on campus. Additional charges do apply to Eastview Terrace rooms.

Brill
Curry
Harris
Miller
Nelson
Panofsky
Young

West Halls
West Halls offers male, female, and co-ed housing in single, regular double, small double, and triple rooms. West Halls also includes the oldest residence halls on campus that are still in use. Several special living options are offered in West Halls, including EMS (Earth and Mineral Sciences), IST Interest House, (LGBT) Ally House, and E-House (Engineering House).

Hamilton
Irvin (EMS)( and once was home to the Penn State football players)
Jordan
McKee (E-House)
Thompson (IST Interest House)
Watts (Ally House)

White Course Apartments
This living area has previously only been available to full-time graduate students.  As of Fall 2008 the area is open to undergraduates. The area provides housing for single graduate students, as well as graduate students in relationships and with families. The area provides one-, two-, and three-bedroom apartments, as well as townhouses.

Bernreuter
Cunningham
Donkin
Dunham
Farrell
Ferguson
Garban
Grubb
Haffner
Holderman
Ikenberry
Lovejoy
Osborn
Palladino
Patterson
Ray

Commonwealth campuses

This is a list of student housing available on the Penn State Commonwealth campuses.

Abington
 Lions Gate

Altoona
 Cedar Hall
 Oak Hall
 Maple Hall
 Spruce Hall

Beaver
 Harmony Hall

Berks
The village
 Sage Hall
 Cedar Hall
 Sweetwood Hall
 Oakmoss Hall
 Laurel Hall
 Greenbriar Hall
The Woods
 Amber Hall
 Evergreen Hall
 Ivy Hall
 Juniper Hall
 Pepperwood Hall
 Poplar Hall
 Willow Hall

Brandywine

 Orchard Hall

Erie, The Behrend College
 Almy Hall
 Lawrence Hall
 Niagara Hall
 Ohio Hall
 Perry Hall
 Porcupine Hall
 Senat Hall
 Tiffany Hall
 Tigress Hall
 Behrend Apartments

Harrisburg
 The Village at Capital College Apartment Complex
1000 
2000
3000
4000
5000
6000
7000
8000
9000

Hazleton
 North Hall
 South Hall
 West Hall

Greater Allegheny

 McKeesport Hall

Mont Alto
 Mont Alto Hall
 Penn Gate I
 Penn Gate II

Schuylkill
 Nittany I
 Nittany II
 Nittany III
 Nittany IV
 Nittany V

References

External links
Penn State University Park Housing

Pennsylvania State University campus
Penn State residence halls
Pennsylvania State University residence halls